Matthieu Ricard (born 15 February 1946) is a French writer, photographer, translator and Buddhist monk who resides at Shechen Tennyi Dargyeling Monastery in Nepal.

Matthieu Ricard grew up among the personalities and ideas of French intellectual circles. He received a PhD degree in molecular genetics from the Pasteur Institute in 1972. He then decided to forsake his scientific career and instead practice Tibetan Buddhism, living mainly in the Himalayas.

Ricard is a board member of the Mind and Life Institute. He received the French National Order of Merit for his humanitarian work in the East with Karuna-Shechen, the non-profit organization he co-founded in 2000 with Rabjam Rinpoche. Since 1989, he has acted as the French interpreter for the 14th Dalai Lama. Since 2010, he has been travelling and giving a series of talks with and assisting in teachings by Dilgo Khyentse Rinpoche, the incarnation of Kyabje Dilgo Khyentse Rinpoche.

Life

Born in Aix-les-Bains, Savoie, France, he is the son of the late Jean-François Revel (born Jean-François Ricard), a renowned French philosopher. His mother is the lyrical abstractionist painter and Tibetan Buddhist nun Yahne Le Toumelin. Matthieu Ricard grew up among the personalities and ideas of French intellectual circles.

Ricard worked for a PhD degree in molecular genetics at the Pasteur Institute under French Nobel Laureate François Jacob. After completing his doctoral thesis in 1972, Ricard decided to forsake his scientific career and concentrate on the practice of Tibetan Buddhism.

Ricard then went to India where he lived in the Himalayas studying with the Kangyur Rinpoche and some other teachers of that tradition. He became a close student and friend of Dilgo Khyentse Rinpoche until Rinpoche's death in 1991. Since then, Ricard has dedicated his activities to fulfilling Khyentse Rinpoche's vision.

Ricard has been called the "happiest person in the world" by several popular media. Matthieu Ricard was a volunteer subject in a study performed at the University of Wisconsin–Madison on happiness, scoring significantly above the average of hundreds of volunteers.

He co-authored a study on the brains of long-term meditators, including himself, who had undergone a minimum of three years in retreat.

Ricard is a board member of the Mind and Life Institute, which is devoted to meetings and collaborative research between scientists, Buddhist scholars and meditators, his contributions have appeared in Destructive Emotions (edited by Daniel Goleman) and other books of essays. He is engaged in research on the effect of mind training on the brain, in various institutions, including Madison-Wisconsin, Princeton and Berkeley universities in the United States, the Max Planck Institute in Leipzig, Germany, the University of Liège in Belgium, and at the Inserm centres of Lyon and Caen in France.

Publishing
Ricard's photographs of the spiritual masters, the landscape, and the people of the Himalayas have appeared in numerous books and magazines. Henri Cartier-Bresson has said of his work, "Matthieu's camera and his spiritual life make one, and from this springs these images, fleeting and eternal."

He is the author and photographer of Tibet, An Inner Journey and Monk Dancers of Tibet and, in collaboration, the photobooks Buddhist Himalayas, Journey to Enlightenment and Motionless Journey: From a Hermitage in the Himalayas. He is the translator of numerous Buddhist texts, including The Life of Shabkar.

The dialogue with his father, Jean-Francois Revel, The Monk and the Philosopher, was a best seller in Europe and was translated into 21 languages, and The Quantum and the Lotus (coauthored with Trinh Xuan Thuan) reflects his long-standing interest in science and Buddhism. His 2003 book Plaidoyer pour le bonheur (published in English in 2006 as Happiness: A Guide to Developing Life's Most Important Skill) explores the meaning and fulfillment of happiness and was a major best-seller in France.

In June 2015, the English translation of Altruism: The Power of Compassion to Change Yourself and the World was published and excerpted as the cover story of Spirituality & Health Magazine .

Ricard is the also the author of Caring Economics: Conversations on Altruism and Compassion, Between Scientists, Economists, and the Dalai Lama (forthcoming 2015).

Awards and other activities
Ricard received the French National Order of Merit for his humanitarian work in the East. He donates all proceeds from his books and conferences, as well as much of his time to over 200 humanitarian projects in Nepal, India and Tibet (www.karuna-shechen.org) which serve over 300,000 beneficiaries every year in the fields of health care, education and social service. He is also active for the preservation of the Himalayan cultural heritage (www.shechen.org). Since 1989, he has acted as the French interpreter for the Dalai Lama.

Ricard has spoken on many international forums, including the World Happiness Forum,  the United-Nations (as part of the Gross National Happiness resolution proposed by Bhutan), conferences held in Sydney, London, San Francisco and Singapore, the Global Economic Symposium, The World Government Summit and other venues. He has been invited ten times to the World Economic Forum.

Personal meditation practice
Ricard uses three types of meditation: compassion, open awareness, and analytic. He has spent a total of 5 years in solitary meditation, largely in a remote mountain hut.

Veganism
Ricard is a vegan. He promotes veganism and animal rights, on which he wrote his 2016 book A Plea for the Animals.

Publications

Essays and books 

 With Trinh Xuan Thuan.

Ricard, Matthieu; Gruhl, Jason; Hall, Becca (2020). Our Animal Neighbors. New York City: Shambhala.

Translation works

Articles 

 
 Ricard, M., On the relevance of a contemplative science. Buddhism and Science: Breaking New Grounds, 2003, 261–279.
 
 Ekman, P., Davidson, R. J., Ricard, M. & Wallace, B. A., Buddhist and psychological perspectives on emotions and well-Being. Current Directions in Psychological Science 14, 2005, 59–63.
 
 
  Dambrun, M., & Ricard, M., La transcendance de soi et le bonheur : une mise à l’épreuve du modèle du bonheur basé sur le soi centré-décentré. Les Cahiers Internationaux de Psychologie Sociale, 2012/1, no. 93, p. 89–102.
 
 
 Ricard, M., Lutz, A., & Davidson, R. J., Mind of the meditator. Scientific American, 2014, 311(5), 38–45.
 
 Ahuvia, A., Thin, N., Haybron, D., Biswas-Diener, R., Ricard, M., & Timsit, J., Happiness: An Interactionist Perspective. International Journal of Wellbeing, 2015, 5(1).

References

External links 

 Official website
 Ricard's English-language blogsite
 
 Mind and Life Institute
 Karuna-Shechen website – Ricard's humanitarian non-profit organization for his projects in Tibet, Nepal, and India
"The Science of Mind & Reality" – video with neuroscientist Wolf Singer
"Change your Mind, Change your Brain: The Inner Conditions for Authentic Happiness" – video of a lecture given at Google in 2007
 
"The habits of happiness" (TED2004)
"How to let altruism be your guide" (TED2014)
"Altruism and Change : Conversation Between Matthieu Ricard and Tan Chade Meng" at Singapore Management University, Wee Kim Wee Centre 
 "The Elements of Metaphor" interview with ascent magazine
Matthieu Ricard & Richard Gere on Altruism
 "The world's happiest man" at Ode Magazine
 Spirituality & Health Magazine cover story by Matthieu Ricard
 Matthieu Ricard: Monk, Activist and Photographer Interview with Haxie Meyers-Belkin on Perspectives, France24. 14 October 2019

1946 births
Buddhist artists
Buddhist translators
Living people
People from Aix-les-Bains
French Buddhist monks
French photographers
French spiritual writers
French veganism activists
Nepalese Buddhist monks
Nepalese people of French descent
Tibetan Buddhists from France
Tibetan Buddhists from Nepal
Nepalese monks
French animal rights scholars
French male non-fiction writers
French translators